In enzymology, an indanol dehydrogenase is an enzyme that catalyzes the chemical reaction

indan-1-ol + NAD(P)+  indanone + NAD(P)H + H+

The 3 substrates of this enzyme are indan-1-ol, NAD+, and NADP+, whereas its 4 products are indanone, NADH, NADPH, and H+.

This enzyme belongs to the family of oxidoreductases, specifically those acting on the CH-OH group of donor with NAD+ or NADP+ as acceptor. The systematic name of this enzyme class is indan-1-ol:NAD(P)+ 1-oxidoreductase.

References

 
 

EC 1.1.1
NADPH-dependent enzymes
NADH-dependent enzymes
Enzymes of unknown structure